Harbin Northern Forest Zoo, formerly Harbin Zoo, is the main zoological garden in Harbin. Several endangered animal species are preserved in the zoo, including Siberian tiger, white lion and red-crowned crane.

Former sites
Former Harbin Zoo was located at 95 Hexing Road, Nangang District, Harbin before its relocation to the current site in 2004. Established as Yashkin Garden in 1899 by Russians in Manchuria, it served as the specimen garden of Northeast Forestry University. In 1954, Harbin municipal government transformed the garden into Harbin Zoo. Since then, polar bears, monkeys, lions, pandas and other various animals were introduced into the zoo.

The former site at Hexing Road was transformed into Science Park of Harbin Institute of Technology after the zoo's relocation to Acheng.

References

Zoos in China
Tourist attractions in Harbin
Parks in Heilongjiang